George Hamilton, 3rd Earl of Abercorn ( – before 1683) died unmarried in Padua on a voyage to Rome. He was succeeded by Claud Hamilton, heir of Claud Hamilton, 2nd Baron Hamilton of Strabane, second son of the 1st Earl of Abercorn.

Birth and origins 
George was born about 1636, probably in Paisley, Scotland, as the third son of James Hamilton and his wife Katherine Clifton. His father was the 2nd Earl of Abercorn.

George's mother was Dowager Duchess of Lennox from her previous marriage and Baroness Clifton of Leighton Bromswold in her own right. Both his parents were Catholic. They had married in 1627.

He was the youngest of three brothers who are listed in his father's article. His two brothers predeceased his father without producing a male heir.

Early life 
On 17 September 1637 his mother died in Scotland when he was about a year old. She was buried without ceremony as she was Catholic. At that time his father was deep in debt owing more than 400,000 merks (about £20,000 Sterling) to his creditors.

In 1649 his father was excommunicated by the General Assembly of the Church of Scotland as a Catholic and ordered to leave the kingdom. On 22 June 1652 he sold Paisley to the Earl of Angus for £13,333 6s 8d Scots (about £1100 Sterling).

Father's succession 
His two elder brothers grew up to reach adulthood but predeceased his father, making him the only surviving son and heir. He therefore succeeded as the 3rd Earl of Abercorn at his father's death in about 1670.

Death, succession, and timeline 
Lord Abercorn died in his forties, unmarried, about 1680, in Padua, Veneto, Italy, on his way to Rome,

With his death, the senior line of the Abercorns failed. The title passed to the nearest cadet branch which was that of the barons Hamilton of Strabane, who descended from his uncle Claud. The representative of this line, Claud's grandson, Claud Hamilton, 5th Baron Hamilton of Strabane, therefore became the 4th Earl of Abercorn.

Notes and references

Notes

Citations

Sources 

 
  – G to K (for Hamilton of Strabane - citing the 1st version as the letter H of the 2nd is not yet in the public domain)
  – Ab-Adam to Basing (for Abercorn)
  – Canonteign to Cutts (for Clifton)
  – England
  – (for timeline)
 
 
  – Abercorn to Balmerino

 

1630s births
1680s deaths
03
Younger sons of barons